Kouinine is a town and commune in El Oued District, El Oued Province, Algeria. According to the 2008 census it has a population of 10,076, up from 7,571 in 1998, with a population growth rate of 3.0%.

Climate

Kouinine has a hot desert climate (Köppen climate classification BWh), with very hot summers and mild winters. Rainfall is light and sporadic, and summers are particularly dry.

Transportation
Kouinine is on the N48, just  from the provincial capital El Oued, of which Kounine forms a part of its urban area . The N48 leads north to Still and eventually Biskra.

Education

7.0% of the population has a tertiary education, and another 23.2% has completed secondary education. The overall literacy rate is 84.9%, and is 90.5% among males and 79.1% among females.

Localities
The commune of Kouinine is composed of two localities:

Kouinine
Oumih Bahia

References

Neighbouring towns and cities

Communes of El Oued Province